Aultbea (Gaelic: An t-Allt Beithe) is a small coastal fishing village in the North-West Highlands of Scotland. The village has a primary school and a small post office.

Aultbea has two churches, a shop, a masonic lodge and a craft shop. , a third small church was under construction. Aultbea has a NATO refuelling base which serves large ships. There is an annual "fun day" when people from the village and surrounding area play football or other activities, or socialise over home-baked scones.

The village has two hotels. The Aultbea Hotel and the Drumchork Lodge Hotel, where the Loch Ewe Distillery was located until its closure in 2017. Both hotels are closed .

The nearest airport is in Stornoway, although that is located on the Isle of Lewis and thus not convenient for onward travel to Aultbea. The nearest railway station is at Achnasheen, which has trains either to Inverness or westwards through the scenic village Plockton to Kyle of Lochalsh. There is also a ferry service to the Isle of Lewis in the relatively nearby town of Ullapool. This service was once proposed to be based in Aultbea but due to Aultbea's remote setting, Ullapool was granted the ferry port. In 1893, a rail track to Aultbea was planned but again the decision went against the village as demand for such a service was expected to be low.

Sport 
Together with the nearby village of Gairloch, Aultbea has an amateur football team – Gairloch Aultbea United or GA United.

Attractions 
Aultbea offers sandy beaches as well as rocky shores, all of which look out at the Isle of Ewe. Scattered around the area are the remains of World War II buildings and barracks. Next to the local football pitch is a display board, which describes the role of the buildings in detail. Aultbea has views out to Cove and the Isle of Lewis, as well as the nearby Torridon Hills. There is a small, blue bar situated at the side of the Aultbea Hotel which offers great views of the shore and bird life.

Geography and climate 
The coast is affected by the North Atlantic Drift, bringing relatively warm waters. These are ideal for jellyfish, which can swarm the local waters, as well as visiting dolphins. The Northern Lights are visible on occasion depending on the weather and time of year, around the equinox being best. The record lowest temperature is amongst the highest in the UK. The lowest temperature was recorded on 17 December 2010. On 22 February 2019, Aultbea recorded its warmest February day on record, with 16.5 °C. As of 19:11 GMT on 22 February it was the warmest place in the UK with 16.2 °C. This was then beaten the next day, with a temperature of 16.8 °C.

Places to go 
The main shop is known locally as Aultbea Stores. The Oran Na Mara Cafe sells homemade food, cakes, teas and coffee and has a gift shop. Loch Ewe Distillery in Drumchork was the smallest licensed distillery of Scotland. The two hotels both have restaurants and sell bar meals. There is a perfume studio with a cafe near Aultbea. There are many fishing hotspots in nearby rivers and lochs, and many walks into the hills and the nearby Laide Wood.

The Russian Arctic Convoy Exhibition Centre commemorates the Arctic convoys of World War II.

References

 Aultbea

External links
laidewood.org.uk

Populated places in Ross and Cromarty